The Venice Community Housing Corporation (VCHC) was formed in 1988 by a group of grassroots activists who were interested in preserving affordable housing in the Venice neighborhood of Los Angeles, California, United States. Since that time, VCHC has grown to a comprehensive community development corporation with family support programs, gang prevention programs, job training and affordable housing.

Mission
VCHC’s mission is to preserve the economic, racial and social diversity of Venice and the surrounding area, by maximizing affordable housing, economic and community development opportunities and by providing needed social services to low income residents, while ignoring the desires of local residents with our mission only at heart.

History
The community of Venice has historically opened its doors to a wide diversity of people, including many African Americans restricted from home ownership in other parts of Los Angeles, low-income Latinos displaced by freeway development, starving artists, wandering youth and older citizens on fixed incomes.  In 1988, the Mayor’s Blue Ribbon Committee for Affordable Housing identified an emerging housing crisis in Los Angeles, fueled –- especially on the coast –- by escalating rents and property values.  The resulting gentrification was already threatening the rich diversity that made up the Venice community.  The same year, VCHC was founded with a mission to preserve, maintain and expand affordable housing opportunities for low-income families in Venice and the surrounding neighborhoods.  In 1994, responding to heightened gang violence in these neighborhoods, VCHC broadened its mission to add economic development opportunities and family support services.

Background
Affordable housing deregulation and welfare reform have compounded the housing problem in Venice, but residents face additional barriers to success.  Venice’s Oakwood neighborhood and adjacent Mar Vista are pockets of extreme poverty and crime in the midst of an otherwise relatively affluent part of the City.  The Los Angeles Police Department has reported that 90% of the crime in the  Pacific policing division occurs in the two square miles of Oakwood and Mar Vista.

Programs and Services
VCHC offers a variety of programs that work synergistically to foster stable, self-reliant individuals, families and neighborhoods.  These include:

Affordable Housing
VCHC’s flagship program, provides 175 units of affordable housing in 13 buildings in Venice and Mar Vista, including a 32-bed transitional shelter for formerly homeless mothers and their children and 31 units dedicated for formerly homeless individuals who have substance abuse and/or mental health issues.

Tenant Services
On-site family services at housing facilities include CommunityWorks for Kids, an after school arts, education and recreation program for tenants in our buildings ages 6–12 and, case management  to help formerly homeless, disabled tenants stay housed and reach their full potential in life.

Infant Toddler Development Center
The onsite Infant Toddler Development Center cares for very young children, ages three months to three years, while their parents pursue employment and educational opportunities and access long-term case management.  VCHC offers the childcare program in partnership with two neighboring organizations, St. Joseph Center and the Venice Family Clinic.

YouthBuild
YouthBuild trains at-risk youth in the construction trades, helps develop leadership skills, supports them to obtain their high school diplomas or GEDs, and connects them to jobs so they can transition into long-term employment or continue educational pursuits.

Another Chance
Another Chance is an on-site charter school that provides out of school youth with an education in order to help them earn a high school diploma.

Venice High School Teen Court
Teen Court is a peer-based system that provides an alternative to the juvenile system for young people accused of first-time minor offenses, while providing participants an inside view of the legal system. The program is a partnership between VCHC, L.A. County Probation Dept. and Venice High School.

HandyWorker
Under contract with the Los Angeles Housing Department, VCHC provides free minor home repairs for low-income elderly and disabled homeowners.  YouthBuild trainees have an opportunity to assist skilled trades people and gain first-hand experience in this program.

VCHC Study Lounge (formerly L.A. Bridges)
VCHC Study Lounge, formerly known as L.A. Bridges, is an after school program at the Mark Twain Middle School for youth, ages 10–14, who are at high risk for gang involvement.  Services include mentoring, tutoring, life and leadership skills, case management and recreational activities.

Westside Repair and Painting Services (WRAPS)
WRAPS provides quality, timely, and affordable home repair services to Los Angeles residents and property managers while generating income to support VCHC's vital programs; creating training and transitional employment opportunities for YouthBuild Trainees; and preserving housing.

Venice Music Festival
The Venice Music Festival is an annual community event, generally held in the fall, organized by the VCHC.  A Champagne Brunch kicks off the event and the afternoon features musical performances, a silent auction, and activities such as rock climbing. Past featured artists include Los Pinguos, Afrobeat Down, Aula, Sono-Lux, and Kwanza Jones.  Proceeds are used to support the VCHC.

References

Venice Community Housing Corporation. Retrieved March 20, 2007.

External links
Venice Community Housing Corporation Homepage

Affordable housing
1988 establishments in California